Nathan Lynn Bachman (August 2, 1878April 23, 1937) was a United States Senator from Tennessee from 1933 until his death. He was a member of the Democratic Party.

Biography
Bachman was born in Chattanooga, Tennessee. His father was Dr. Jonathan W. Bachman, Confederate veteran and former pastor of First Presbyterian Church in Chattanooga. He attended several colleges, including the former Southwestern Presbyterian University in Clarksville, Tennessee (the predecessor institution to the current Rhodes College in Memphis, Tennessee; the campus is the current setting of Austin Peay State University), Central University in Richmond, Kentucky (now merged with Centre College in Danville, Kentucky), and Washington and Lee University in Lexington, Virginia. He then returned home, attending the Chattanooga College of Law (then the law school of the former University of Chattanooga, now the University of Tennessee at Chattanooga) before actually graduating from the law school of the University of Virginia in 1903. He began the practice of law in Chattanooga that same year.

Bachman was Chattanooga city attorney from 1906 to 1908 and circuit court judge from 1912 to 1918. In 1918 he became an associate justice of the Tennessee Supreme Court, resigning in 1924 to run for the U.S. Senate. His 1924 campaign was unsuccessful and he returned to the practice of law.

However, on February 28, 1933, Bachman was appointed to the United States Senate by governor of Tennessee Hill McAlister to the unexpired term of Senator Cordell Hull, who had resigned to accept the appointment of President Franklin D. Roosevelt to the office of Secretary of State. In November, 1934, Bachman was elected to the balance of Hull's unexpired term. He completed the term to which Hull had been elected and was subsequently elected to a full term in his own right in 1936. He died in Washington, D.C., the next spring after having served less than four months of that term.

Bachman was a prominent leader in the Masonic fraternity in Chattanooga, including the Knights Templar Commandery # 14. He was also an active Civitan.

Death
Driver died from a heart attack in Washington, D.C., on April 27, 1937 (age 58 years). He is interred at Forest Hills Cemetery, Chattanooga, Tennessee.

The "Bachman Tubes"

The Bachman Tubes are highway tunnels on U.S. Highway 41 through Missionary Ridge connecting Chattanooga with the adjacent town of East Ridge, which are named in his father's honor.

See also 
 List of United States Congress members who died in office (1900–49)

References 
 

1878 births
1937 deaths
Politicians from Chattanooga, Tennessee
Presbyterians from Tennessee
Democratic Party United States senators from Tennessee
American prosecutors
Justices of the Tennessee Supreme Court
20th-century American politicians
20th-century American judges
Centre College alumni
Washington and Lee University alumni
University of Tennessee at Chattanooga alumni
University of Virginia School of Law alumni